Gahnia rigida is a tussock-forming perennial in the family Cyperaceae, that is native to parts of New Zealand.

References

rigida
Plants described in 1877
Flora of New Zealand
Taxa named by Thomas Kirk